Zakia Ismael Hakki (born 18 November 1939, d. 22 August 2021) was a Feyli Kurdish lawyer who was appointed Iraq's first female judge in 1959, becoming the first woman of an Arabian nation to be appointed as a judge. She fled Iraq in 1996 after her husband was killed and was granted asylum in the United States. She returned to Iraq in 2003 and was elected to the National Assembly of Iraq and was an advisor in the drafting of the constitution.

Early life and education
Zakia Hakki was born on 18 November 1939 in Baghdad to an established Feyli Kurdish family. She graduated from law school in 1957, one of five women in a class of 350. She has a Bachelor of Science in business administration from the International Labor Union in Switzerland and a Doctor of Law degree from the University of Baghdad.

Career
Hakki worked in Baghdad as both a lawyer and judge. In the 1950s, she smuggled documents into the US embassy about the treatment of Kurds in Iraq. She founded the Kurdish Women's Federation and served as its president from 1958 to 1975.

Haqqi advocated for the rights of Kurdish people and women. She was a founding member of the Kurdish Women's Association and became its president in 1958, a post she held till 1975.

In 1959, Hakki was appointed as a judge by Abd al-Karim Qasim, becoming the first woman appointed as a judge in Iraq, and making her the first female judge in the Middle East.

In 1970, she became the only woman in the leadership of the Kurdistan Democratic Party. In 1959, Abd al-Karim Qasim appointed Haqqi to the bench. She became the first woman in the Arab world to be appointed a judge.

During 1970–75, she was the head of Kurdistan Democratic Party. Constant persecution from Saddam Hussein's regime, forced her to move to the United States in 1996, where she worked as a lawyer.

In 1975, she received her Juris Doctor degree from University of Baghdad's law school.

She was a senior official in the ministries of industry and agriculture in the pre-Saddam Hussein period. As Hussein gained power, she joined the Kurdish cause, fighting as a guerrilla until she was arrested and tortured in 1975. The regime placed her under house arrest and she fled with other KDP leaders to Iran, supported by the Shah. She returned to Baghdad but kept a lower political profile, working in family and civil law. She survived numerous assassination attempts and her husband and brother were killed by Hussein's people for speaking out against the regime's policies.

Hakki fled Iraq in 1996, bribing her way out of the country with a valuable carpet. She received political asylum in the United States. She was a member of the Independents Liberal Politician Iraqi Women Group, speaking out about conditions for women in Hussein's Iraq.

Hakki worked as an attorney in Northern Virginia and was the vice president of the Iraqi-American Council. She supported her son in his fight for asylum in the US after he was accused of being a double agent.

Hakki returned to Iraq in 2003, seeking to put her legal expertise to work in rebuilding the country. She was elected a member of the interim parliament. She was hired by the Coalition Provisional Authority's interim Ministry of Justice to make recommendations about legal reforms to the Constitution Review Committee. However, neither she nor any other woman was able to participate in the drafting process for the new constitution, debate the constitution publicly or review it before the final draft became public.

In 2004, Hakki was an outspoken opponent against the US-backed Iraqi Governing Council's decision to cancel family laws and place jurisdiction under sharia, saying, "This new law will send Iraqi families back to the Middle Ages." When Shiite Islamic parties pushed for sharia to be enshrined in the interim constitution, Hakki used her Department of Defense clearance to bring activists into the Green Zone and staged sit-ins in US proconsul Paul Bremer's office until he agreed to veto sharia. She was an adviser to Iraq's Ministry of Justice in 2004 and 2005. In 2005 she said, "I am thankful America liberated us from Saddam Hussein, but I resent how it has been dealing with Iraqis since then."

She won the January 2005 Iraqi parliamentary election and served on the drafting committee. The same December she was elected to the Iraqi Council of Representatives and was a member of the Constitutional Review Committee.

Personal life
Hakki was a Shia Muslim. During the Ba'athist rule in Iraq, Haqqi was placed under house arrest. The then President Saddam Hussein had her husband, brother and cousins killed. Two of her sons were evacuated to Guam and held in INS detention: Ali, a doctor with his wife and two children, and his brother who had deserted Hussein's army after witnessing the destruction of a Kurdish village.

She died in a Virginia hospital on August 22, 2021.

References

External links
 Iraqi Women - Interview with Judge Zakia Hakki

Living people
1939 births
People from Baghdad
University of Baghdad alumni
Iraqi Shia Muslims
20th-century Iraqi judges
Iraqi Kurdish feminists
Kurdistan Democratic Party politicians
21st-century Kurdish women politicians
Political office-holders in Iraq
Women judges
Iraqi women lawyers
20th-century Iraqi women politicians
20th-century Iraqi politicians
21st-century Iraqi women politicians
21st-century Iraqi politicians
21st-century Iraqi lawyers
Iraqi Kurdish women